Balgreen ( or ) (Scottish Gaelic: Baile Griain) is a suburb of Edinburgh, located approximately two miles west of the city centre, most commonly known for its primary school, Balgreen Primary. It is located to the west of Murrayfield and Saughtonhall, to the east of Corstorphine, and to the north of Gorgie. It is bound to the north by Corstorphine Hill, to the west by Carrick Knowe Golf Course, and roughly to the east by Water of Leith.

Etymology

The name comes from Balgreen House once situated where Balgreen School now stands and is probably derived from Scottish Gaelic, perhaps being Baile na Grèine (sunny farm ) or Baile Griain (gravel farm) from the gravel on the riverbank, or perhaps from Baile Grianain (farm of the sunny enclosure). It does not, as some etymologies have suggested, come from "Ball Green". The Gaelic "Bal-" (farm) prefix can also be found in Balerno and is not unusual in the area. The placename Balgreen is also found near Murieston and Ecclesmachanin West Lothian.

Amenities
The Water of Leith flows through here with the Water of Leith Walkway connecting the area to Stockbridge to the north east and Colinton and Balerno to the south west. There is also a library, primary school, and a large park here, with facilities for football (soccer) etc., and a children's playpark.

Transport

Tram 

Balgreen tram stop is located off Balgreen Road,  adjacently north of the main Glasgow to Edinburgh railway line.

Buses

Lothian Buses 

 12,26,31   (Corstorphine Road) 
 1,2,22,30  (Western Approach Road) 
 38         (Balgreen Road/ Saughtonhall Drive)

McGill's Scotland East 

 21 and 22  (Corstorphine Road)

Rail 
Balgreen was served by Balgreen Halt railway station which was closed in 1968.

Notable residents
 William Stevenson (1772–1829), Scottish nonconformist preacher and writer, farmed in this area.

References
 Bell, Raymond MacKean Literary Corstorphine: A reader's guide to West Edinburgh, Leamington Books, Edinburgh 2017
 Cant, Michael, Villages of Edinburgh volumes 1 & 2, John Donald Publishers Ltd., Edinburgh, 1986-1987.  & 
 Harris, Stuart (1996). The Place Names of Edinburgh. Edinburgh: Gordon Wright Publishing. p. 144. .

Areas of Edinburgh
1986 Commonwealth Games venues
Edinburgh Trams stops